(born 8 January 1996) is a Japanese cyclist, who currently rides for UCI Continental team .

Major results
2013
 2nd Time trial, Asian Junior Road Championships
 3rd Time trial, National Junior Road Championships
2014
 1st  Time trial, National Junior Road Championships
2015
 2nd Time trial, National Under-23 Road Championships
2016
 3rd Time trial, Asian Under-23 Road Championships
2017
 3rd Road race, National Under-23 Road Championships
2018
 Asian Road Championships
1st Team time trial
1st Under-23 road race
2021
 2nd Oita Urban Classic
 3rd Overall Tour of Japan
 National Road Championship
 2nd Time trial
 4th Road race
2022
 3rd Road race, National Road Championship
 7th Overall Tour de Kumano
 1st Mountains classification
 8th Overall Tour of Japan

References

External links

1996 births
Living people
Japanese male cyclists